Kittens for Christian is a punk rock band that is signed with Serjical Strike Records. They released an album, Privilege of Your Company, on September 9, 2003.

Band members
Hiram Fleites — bass, vocals
Neil Young — guitar
Ed Diffner — drums

Past members
Fate Fatal — (1991-1993)  vocals, The Deep Eynde, A Million Machines

Discography

Albums
1996: Building a Socialist Work Ethic
2003: Privilege of Your Company

EPs
2001: Is That What Sex Is Like?

Vinyl
1993: Flowers 7"

Cassette
1992: Bless the Worm Kisses

External links
 Official site (Sony Music)
Serjical Strike Records
 Blender.com review of "Privilege of Your Company"

Punk rock groups from California
Musical groups from Los Angeles